Anseau de Cayeux or Anselm de Cayeux was a French knight from Picardy, who participated in the Fourth Crusade (1202-1204) and later became one of the leading nobles of the Latin Empire, serving as regent in Constantinople (1237-1238). He was married to Byzantine princess Eudokia Laskarina, younger daughter of former emperor Theodore I Laskaris.

Biography
A descendant of the lords of Cayeux-sur-Mer, according to Geoffrey of Villehardouin he took up the cross in spring 1200 along with Hugh IV, Count of Saint-Pol, and remained in the latter's entourage until the fall of Constantinople to the Fourth Crusade in April 1204. According to a letter by Hugh IV, Anseau was among the knights who voted in favour of diverting the Crusade to Constantinople following the Siege of Zara. 

Following Hugh's death in 1205, Anseau joined the following of Henry of Flanders, the younger brother of the Latin Emperor, Baldwin of Flanders.  After Baldwin was captured by the Bulgarians in the Battle of Adrianople, Henry was raised to regent of the Latin Empire. He in turn appointed Anseau as commander of the garrison at Bizye, along with six other knights and a larger number of foot soldiers. From this post he successfully defended the city against the Bulgarian tsar Kaloyan, who in the aftermath of Adrianople had captured most of the other cities in Thrace.

He continues to be mentioned alongside Henry of Flanders (who became Emperor after 1206) in the chronicle of Henry of Valenciennes as Ansil de Kaeu. Along with Conon de Béthune he led in 1207 the unsuccessful negotiations in the Pagasetic Gulf with the Lombard barons under Ravano dalle Carceri, who refused to accept the suzerainty of Emperor Henry.

Around 1230, Anseau married the Byzantine princess Eudokia Laskarina, a daughter of the Nicaean emperor Theodore I Laskaris. The princess was originally betrothed to the Latin Emperor Robert of Courtenay, but was rejected by him, which in the event cost him his throne. Following the death of John of Brienne, the senior co-emperor and guardian of Emperor Baldwin II of Constantinople, in March 1237, Anseau became regent of the Empire, which was now mostly limited to Constantinople and its environs, as Baldwin II was absent in Western Europe. His title as regent was bailli, and he retained his position for about a year, after which he was replaced by Narjot de Toucy.

In 1247, he assigned custody over the city of Tzurulon to his wife Eudokia, in hope that it will not be attacked by John III Doukas Vatatzes, who was married to Eudokia′s sister Irene Laskarina.

Attribution of later data
As a participant of the Fourth Crusade (1202-1204), Anseau de Cayeux would already approach at least sixty years of age by the 1250, and therefore the attribution of some later data to him is not certain, since it is possible that such data may also refer to his son of the same name. 

Documents from 1253-1255, issued by the papal chancellery, mention the marriage "inter Anselmum de Keu ac Mariam, natam Matildis dominae de Posaga, natae comitissae Viennensis", designating the bride as "Maria, nate quondam Calojohanni" and also mentioning Maria′s maternal uncle as "imperatore Constantinopolitano, eiusdem Matildis avunculo". Those data allowed Gordon McDaniel to identify Maria′s father as John Angelos, lord of Syrmia, and Maria′s mother as Matilda, daughter of Henry I, Count of Vianden and Marguerite de Courtenay (sister of the Latin emperors Robert and Baldwin II).

In 1269-1270, certain "Anselinus de Chaus, Camerarius Imperii Romani" was residing at the court of king Charles I of Naples. With royal approval, he regulated dowry of his daughter Eva (short for Evdokia), who was married to Dreux de Beaumont, marshal of the Kingdom of Naples. While residing in the Kingdom of Naples, he also kept contacts with king Stephen V of Hungary (1270-1272): "Anselinus de Chaus dilectus amicus vult mietere nuntium ad magnificum principem Stephanum, illustrem regem Ungarie".

It is not certain whether the father or the son should be recognized in data from 1269-1270. If those data would be attributed to elder Anseau (the father), he would be at least eighty or more years old in 1269-1270. Without excluding other possibilities, Michael Angold proposed that data from 1253-1254 and 1269 should be attributed to younger Anseau (the son).  

Such conclusion would be supported by an important formulation from the document issued in 1254, regarding the marriage between "Nobili viro Anselmo, nato nobilis viri de Quo, et nobili mulieri Marie, nate quondam Calojohanni". The formulation "Nobili viro Anselmo, nato nobilis viri de Quo" contains an explicit filiation and translates as: "nobleman Anselmo, born from the nobleman of Quo", thus mentioning not only the groom Anselmo (the son), but also his father (the nobleman of Quo) whose name was the same and therefore not repeated.

Advanced age would exclude the possibility that even later data on Anseau de Chau, who served in 1273-1274 as Charles of Naples' vicar-general in Albania, could refer to the participant of the Fourth Crusade (1202-1204), and therefore it is believed that those data must refer to his son, who had the same name. That son would be married (since 1253-1255) to Maria, daughter of John Angelos of Syrmia, and later (1269) would serve as camerlengo ("Camerarius Imperii Romani"), and also as governor of Albania (1273-1274). Sister of his wife Maria was Serbian queen Jelena (d. 1314).

References

Bibliography

 
 
 
 
 
 
 
 
 
 
 Robert Fossier. La terre et les hommes en Picardie jusqu'à la fin du XIIIe siècle (Paris 1968)
 Robert Lee Wolff, Romania: The Latin Empire of Constantinople (1204-1261) (Harvard, 1947)

External links
 Geoffrey de Villehardouin: Memoirs or Chronicle of The Fourth Crusade and The Conquest of Constantinople
 Eudoxia de Cayeux

12th-century births
13th-century deaths
Christians of the Fourth Crusade
Regents of the Latin Empire
People from Picardy
Medieval French knights